The Fortress is a 1979 Hungarian science fiction film directed by Miklós Szinetár. It was entered into the 11th Moscow International Film Festival.

Cast
 Bella Tanay as Edit Nicharchos
 Sándor Oszter as Gregor
 József Madaras as Murketa
 Ádám Rajhona as Sorensen
 Ferenc Bács as Dobrowski
 Gyula Benkő as Bondy Sr.
 Péter Benkő as Bondy Jr. (as Péter Benkő)
 Georgiana Tarjan as Éva (as Györgyi Tarján)
 Nóra Németh as Jane
 Judit Hernádi as Klotild
 Péter Haumann as Steko
 Endre Harkányi as Steiner
 Péter Trokán as Public Prosecutor

References

External links
 

1979 films
1970s science fiction films
1970s Hungarian-language films
Hungarian science fiction films
Films about death games